Ban Chong Tai station is a railway station located in Ban Pa Subdistrict, Kaeng Khoi District, Saraburi Province. It is the location of the branch of the freight spur line to the SCG Kaeng Khoi Cement Factory.

References 

Railway stations in Thailand
Saraburi province